Storo Storsenter is a shopping centre at Storo in Oslo, Norway. It is now under full-scale renovation and expansion, and now has 120 stores, including local and international chains. It also has a number of restaurants, banks and hair dressers. Storo Storsenter is owned by Olav Thon Eiendomsselskap. It is located beside Ring 3 and Storo Station on the Oslo T-bane and Oslo Tramway.

External links
 Official website

Shopping centres in Oslo